Gene Cook (January 11, 1932 – February 14, 2002) was a player in the National Football League, an honored executive in minor league baseball, and a long-time elected official in Toledo, Ohio.

Cook is a member of the International League Hall of Fame.

Football career
Cook played collegiately for the University of Toledo. He was drafted in the 13th round of the 1958 NFL Draft by the Green Bay Packers. Cook was briefly a wide receiver for the Detroit Lions, recording one reception during the 1959 NFL season. He later played semi-professional ball for the Toledo Tornadoes.

Political career
Cook was elected to the Toledo City Council in 1967. Cook served continuously in elected office until his retirement in 1997. He served 13 years as vice mayor and three years as city council president. At the time of his death in 2002, his tenure was the longest in the history of the Toledo City Council.

Minor League Baseball executive
Cook served as the general manager of the minor league baseball Toledo Mud Hens of the International League from 1978 to 1998. He was the team's executive vice president from 1998 to 2002. He was named the International League's Executive of the Year in 1980.

Under Cook's management, the average attendance at Mud Hens games would increase almost threefold. Much of this was due to inventive marketing. In his most well-known move, Cook sent a Mud Hens uniform to the fictional character Cpl. Max Klinger of the television show M*A*S*H, played by actor Jamie Farr, a Toledo native. Thereafter, mentions of the Mud Hens were frequently incorporated into the show's scripts, and the team gained nationwide attention.

Cook was posthumously elected to the International League Hall of Fame in 2008. The number 1 was retired by the Mud Hens in his honor.

Personal life
Cook was married to his wife, Marion, for 45 years. They had two sons, Gary and John, and a daughter, Shelly (Straube).

Cook died in February 2002 after a brief illness.

Notes

References

1932 births
2002 deaths
People from Weakley County, Tennessee
Sportspeople from Toledo, Ohio
Players of American football from Tennessee
Toledo Rockets football players
Detroit Lions players
Minor league baseball executives
Ohio city council members
20th-century American politicians